Laid may refer to:
"Get laid", a slang term for sexual intercourse

Geography
Laid, Sutherland, a township in Scotland
Chelghoum Laïd District, a district of Mila Province, Algeria
Laid (Estonian: island) as in:
Saarnaki laid, an island in the Baltic Sea belonging to the country of Estonia
Uuluti laid, a small islet off the coast of Virtsu Peninsula in the Baltic Sea
Hanikatsi laid (Äpleö, meaning Apple Island), an Estonian islet in the Baltic Sea

People
Laid Saidi, an Algerian that claimed he was imprisoned in a CIA black site in Afghanistan 
Laid Belhamel, an Algerian football player

Companies and brands
Laid (company), a Norwegian company that designs and manufactures sex toys

Film and television
 Laid (TV series), an Australian television series
 Opie Gets Laid, an American film
 Sammy and Rosie Get Laid, a British film

Music
Laid (Dutch: song) as in Grönnens Laid (Song of Groningen), the anthem of the Groningen province in the Netherlands
Laid (album), the sixth release and fifth studio album by the British alternative rock band James 1993
Laid (song), a song by Manchester band James from Laid
Laid (Skunk album), 1991
"Laid", a song by Loudon Wainwright III from 40 Odd Years box set 2011

See also

Lade (disambiguation)